Who Funds You? is a project that rates and promotes transparency of funding sources of think tanks. The project scored think tanks according to four criteria, namely whether the organisation discloses its income, whether it publishes financial details online, whether individual donors and the amounts of each donation are published, and whether corporate donors are named and the amounts of each donation published. The project's first report into think tank transparency was published in June 2012. According to Martin Bright of The Spectator, the "exercise seems to demonstrate that left-leaning think tanks are more transparent than right-wing ones". 

The project was established and managed by volunteers between 2012 and 2019. In 2022, the project was re-launched by openDemocracy, using the same methodology.

References

External links
Who Funds You? website

Think tanks based in the United Kingdom